Gaëtan Poussin (born 13 January 1999) is a French professional footballer who plays as a goalkeeper for  club Bordeaux.

Club career
Poussin signed his first professional contract with Bordeaux in the fall of 2018. He made his professional debut with Bordeaux in a 1–0 Coupe de la Ligue win over Dijon on 19 December 2018.

International career
Poussin is a youth international for France, and represented the France U17s at the 2016 UEFA European Under-17 Championship.

Career statistics

References

External links
 
 
 
 Girondins Profile

1999 births
Living people
Footballers from Le Mans
French footballers
Association football goalkeepers
France youth international footballers
FC Girondins de Bordeaux players
Championnat National 3 players
Ligue 1 players
Ligue 2 players